Texas Stampede is a 1939 American western film directed by Sam Nelson and starring Charles Starrett, Iris Meredith and Bob Nolan. It is a remake of the 1930 film The Dawn Trail

Cast
 Charles Starrett as Tom Randall
 Iris Meredith as 	Joan Cameron
 Fred Kohler Jr. as 	Wayne Cameron
 Bob Nolan as Bob 
 Lee Prather as 	Jeff Cameron
 Ray Bennett as 	Zack Avery
 Blackjack Ward	Abe Avery
 Hank Bell as Hank
 Edmund Cobb as 	Hobbs
 Edward Coxen as Seth 
 Edward Hearn as Owens
 Sons of the Pioneers as 	Ranch Hands / Musicians

References

Bibliography
 Pitts, Michael R. Western Movies: A Guide to 5,105 Feature Films. McFarland, 2012.

External links
 

1939 films
1939 Western (genre) films
American Western (genre) films
Films directed by Sam Nelson
American black-and-white films
Columbia Pictures films
1930s English-language films
Remakes of American films
1930s American films